Aulacodes melanicalis is a moth in the family Crambidae. It was described by George Hampson in 1917. It is found in Colombia.

References

Acentropinae
Moths described in 1917
Moths of South America